Pacaás Novos may refer to:

Pacaás Novos National Park
Rio Pacaás Novos Extractive Reserve
Pacaás Novos River
Pacaás Novos language
Wariʼ (Pakaa Nova) people